The 1960–61 season was FC Steaua București's 13th season since its founding in 1947.

Divizia A

League table

Results

Cupa României

Results

European Cup

Preliminary round

See also

 1960–61 European Cup
 1960–61 Cupa României
 1960–61 Divizia A

Notes and references

External links
 1960–61 FC Steaua București Divizia A matches

FC Steaua București seasons
1960–61 in Romanian football
Steaua, București
Steaua
Romanian football championship-winning seasons